The "Kenyans for Kenya" initiative is a fundraiser that was started in July 2011 by corporate leaders and the Red Cross in response to media reports of famine and deaths from starvation in Turkana County. $10M was raised.

References

Charities based in Kenya
Charity fundraisers